The People vs. Agent Orange is an 2020 American-French television documentary film, directed and produced by Alan Adelson and Kate Taverna. It follows the use of Agent Orange in Vietnam and the United States.

It was released in France on September 29, 2020, on ARTE, and in the United States, it was released through virtual cinema on March 5, 2021, prior to being broadcast on June 28, 2021, on Independent Lens on PBS.

Synopsis
The film follows two activists, Tran To Nga, and Carol Van Strum, as Tran spends several years preparing litigation against American companies that produced herbicides poisoning her and her family, while Strum fights against the use of 24D in her home state of Oregon, and spreads awareness of how Agent Orange is still used in present day.

Release
The film was broadcast in France on September 29, 2020, on Arte. It was released in the United States through virtual cinema on March 5, 2021, prior to being broadcast on Independent Lens on PBS on June 28, 2021.

Reception
The People vs. Agent Orange holds  approval rating on review aggregator website Rotten Tomatoes, based on  reviews.

References

External links
 
 

2020 television films
2020 films
2020 documentary films
American documentary films
French documentary films
Documentary films about war
Documentary films about war crimes
Documentary films about politics
PBS original programming
2020s American films
2020s French films